Sarvan (also, Sarven”) is a village in the Davachi Rayon of Azerbaijan.  The village forms part of the municipality of Xəlilli.

References 

Populated places in Shabran District